If You Give a Dance You Gotta Pay the Band is a 1972 American TV movie. It was the first program shown under the umbrella ABC Theater.

The production (at the time referred to as a "dramatic special" or "teleplay" rather than a made-for-TV movie) was the first screen credit for Laurence Fishburne and led to him getting a role later on in the soap opera One Life to Live.

The teleplay first aired on ABC at 8:30pm ET on Tuesday, December 19, 1972 and was rerun on Wednesday, June 6, 1973 at 9:00pm ET. In TV listings of the era, the title was generally given as If You Give a Dance You Gotta Pay the Band without a comma.

Plot
The story of ghetto boy and girl trying to raise money for the girl to visit her father in prison. It was shot on videotape in November 1972.

References

External links

1972 television films
1972 films
American drama television films
1970s English-language films
1970s American films